Saint-Sorlin is a former commune in the Rhône department in eastern France. On 1 January 2017, it was merged into the new commune Chabanière. Saint-Sorlin is a rural village, located southwest of Lyon and 2 km from Mornant.

Historical population

See also
Communes of the Rhône department

References

Former communes of Rhône (department)